Avon is an unincorporated community and census-designated place (CDP) in Dare County in the U.S. state of North Carolina. As of the 2010 census, it had a permanent population of 776.

Geography
Avon is located on the North Carolina Outer Banks at latitude 35°21'7" North, longitude 75°30'39" West. The village is south of Salvo and north of Buxton on Hatteras Island. The United States Postal Service has assigned Avon the ZIP Code 27915.

Avon is bordered to the east by the Atlantic Ocean and to the west by Pamlico Sound.

Demographics

2020 census

As of the 2020 United States census, there were 832 people, 328 households, and 83 families residing in the CDP.

History
Historically named "Kinnakeet", the village was renamed "Avon" by the U.S. Postal Service when a post office was established there in 1883.  The U.S. Life-Saving Service constructed the Little Kinnakeet Life Saving Station in 1874, remaining active, under the Coast Guard from 1915, until decommissioned in 1954.  The building is now part of the Cape Hatteras National Seashore.

Government
The residents of Avon are governed by the Dare County Board of Commissioners. Avon is part of District 4, along with Buxton, Frisco, Hatteras, Rodanthe, Waves and Salvo.

Climate

According to the Trewartha climate classification system, Avon, North Carolina has a humid subtropical climate with hot and humid summers, cool winters and year-around precipitation (Cfak). Cfak climates are characterized by all months having an average mean temperature > 32.0 °F (> 0.0 °C), at least eight months with an average mean temperature ≥ 50.0 °F (≥ 10.0 °C), at least one month with an average mean temperature ≥ 71.6 °F (≥ 22.0 °C) and no significant precipitation difference between seasons. During the summer months in Avon, a cooling afternoon sea breeze is present on most days, but episodes of extreme heat and humidity can occur with heat index values ≥ 100 °F (≥ 38 °C). Avon is prone to hurricane strikes, particularly during the Atlantic hurricane season which extends from June 1 through November 30, sharply peaking from late August through September. During the winter months, episodes of cold and wind can occur with wind chill values < 15 °F (< -9 °C). The plant hardiness zone in Avon is 8b with an average annual extreme minimum air temperature of 18.5 °F (-7.5 °C). The average seasonal (Dec-Mar) snowfall total is < 2 inches (< 5 cm), and the average annual peak in nor'easter activity is in February.

Ecology

According to the A. W. Kuchler U.S. potential natural vegetation types, Avon, North Carolina would have a dominant vegetation type of Live oak/Sea Oats Uniola paniculata (90) with a dominant vegetation form of Coastal Prairie (20).

Education
Residents are zoned to Dare County Schools. Zoned schools are Cape Hatteras Elementary School and Cape Hatteras Secondary School.

References

External links
 Little Kinnakeet Lifesaving Station: Home to Unsung Heroes, a National Park Service Teaching with Historic Places (TwHP) lesson plan

Populated places established in 1883
Census-designated places in North Carolina
Census-designated places in Dare County, North Carolina
Beaches of North Carolina
Hatteras Island
Beaches of Dare County, North Carolina
Populated coastal places in North Carolina